This is a list of countries by cancer rate, as measured variously by the number of new cancer cases (frequency), or death rate (mortality), per 100,000 population among countries (and dependencies).

Cancer frequency
This is a list of countries by cancer frequency, as measured by the number of new cancer cases per 100,000 population among countries, based on the 2018 GLOBOCAN statistics and including all cancer types (some earlier statistics excluded non-melanoma skin cancer). The numbers are age standardized and data is only available for 50 countries and territories, the majority in Europe, North America and Oceania. In some cases, there are significant differences between the sexes; for example, while Canada is 11th highest overall, it is 21st in men and 5th in women.

See also
Cancer
List of countries by life expectancy

References

External links

International quality of life rankings
Cancer